Jozef Kucej (born 23 March 1965 in Zvolen, Czechoslovakia) is a retired Slovak athlete who specialised in the 400 metres hurdles. He represented Czechoslovakia and later Slovakia at three consecutive Olympic Games, starting in 1988. In addition, he competed at four World Championships.

His personal best in the event is 48.94 seconds (Prague 1989). This is the current Slovak records.

Competition record

1Representing Europe

References

1965 births
Living people
Czechoslovak male hurdlers
Slovak male hurdlers
Athletes (track and field) at the 1988 Summer Olympics
Athletes (track and field) at the 1992 Summer Olympics
Athletes (track and field) at the 1996 Summer Olympics
Olympic athletes of Czechoslovakia
Olympic athletes of Slovakia
Sportspeople from Zvolen